Antonio Biosca Pérez (born 8 December 1948) is a Spanish retired footballer who played as a defender.

He appeared in 220 La Liga matches over ten seasons (eight goals), with Betis, and represented Spain at the 1978 World Cup.

Club career
Born in Almería, Andalusia, Biosca made his senior debut in 1968–69 in Segunda División, appearing rarely for CD Calvo Sotelo who finished in sixth position. In the following summer, he moved to La Liga with Real Betis, making his debut in the competition on 28 November 1971 in a 1–3 away loss against Córdoba CF, finishing his first year with 17 games played (15 starts) and being relegated in the following campaign.

From 1974 to 1978, Biosca never featured in less than 30 league matches for the Verdiblancos, winning the 1977 edition of the Copa del Rey but also suffering relegation the following year. He retired in June 1983 at nearly 34, and settled in Seville, losing all connection to the football world.

International career
Biosca earned three caps for Spain in 1978, and represented his country at that year's FIFA World Cup. His debut came on 26 April, in a friendly with Mexico in Granada.

In the final stages in Argentina, Biosca made two appearances as the national team conceded no goals, albeit in a group stage exit.

Honours
Betis
Copa del Rey: 1976–77
Segunda División: 1973–74

References

External links

1948 births
Living people
Spanish footballers
Footballers from Almería
Association football defenders
La Liga players
Segunda División players
CD Puertollano footballers
Real Betis players
Spain amateur international footballers
Spain international footballers
1978 FIFA World Cup players